The Irish League in season 1899–1900 comprised 6 teams, and Belfast Celtic won the championship.

League standings

Results

References
Northern Ireland - List of final tables (RSSSF)

1899-1900
1899–1900 domestic association football leagues
Lea